The Gibraltar women's national basketball team represents Gibraltar in international women's women's basketball competitions. It is administered by the Gibraltar Amateur Basketball Association. The team participated at every FIBA Women's European Championship for Small Countries since its establishment in 1989.

See also
Gibraltar men's national basketball team
Gibraltar women's national under-18 basketball team
Gibraltar women's national under-16 basketball team

References

Women's national basketball teams
B
Basketball in Gibraltar